The Held–Karp algorithm, also called Bellman–Held–Karp algorithm, is a dynamic programming algorithm proposed in 1962 independently by Bellman and by Held and Karp to solve the traveling salesman problem (TSP), in which the input is a distance matrix between a set of cities, and the goal is to find a minimum-length tour that visits each city exactly once before returning to the starting point. It finds the exact solution to this problem, and to several related problems including the Hamiltonian cycle problem, in exponential time.

Algorithm description and motivation

Number the cities , with  designated arbitrarily as a "starting" city (since the solution to TSP is a cycle, the choice of starting city doesn't matter). We'll compute values of  starting with the smallest sets  and finishing with the largest.

When  has two or fewer elements, then calculating  requires looking at one or two possible shortest paths.

Once  contains three or more cities, the number of paths through  rises quickly, but only a few such paths need to be examined to find the shortest.

More generally, suppose  is a set of  cities.

This stage of the algorithm finishes when  is known for every integer , giving the shortest distance from city  to city  that passes through every other city. The much shorter second stage adds these distances to the edge lengths  to give  possible shortest cycles, and then finds the shortest.

Algorithmic complexity

The Held–Karp algorithm has exponential time complexity , significantly better than the superexponential performance  of a brute-force algorithm. Held–Karp, however, requires  space to hold all computed values of the function , while brute force needs only  space to store the graph itself.

Time

Computing all values of  where  thus requires time , for a total time across all subset sizes . The second stage of the algorithm, finding a complete cycle from  candidates, takes  time and does not affect asymptotic performance.

However, this is a constant factor improvement and does not affect asymptotic performance.

Space

A complete table of values of  thus requires space . This assumes that  is sufficiently small enough such that  can be stored as a bitmask of constant multiple of machine words, rather than an explicit k-tuple.

Example

Distance matrix:

 

Functions description:
 g(x, S) - starting from 1, path min cost ends at vertex x, passing vertices in set S exactly once 
 cxy - edge cost ends at x from y
 p(x, S) - the second-to-last vertex to x from set S. Used for constructing the TSP path back at the end.

k = 0, null set:

Set ∅:
        g(2, ∅) = c21 = 1 
        g(3, ∅) = c31 = 15
        g(4, ∅) = c41 = 6

k = 1, consider sets of 1 element:

Set {2}:
        g(3,{2}) = c32 + g(2, ∅ ) = c32 + c21 = 7 + 1 = 8       p(3,{2}) = 2
        g(4,{2}) = c42 + g(2, ∅ ) = c42 + c21 = 3 + 1 = 4       p(4,{2}) = 2
Set {3}:
        g(2,{3}) = c23 + g(3, ∅ ) = c23 + c31 = 6 + 15 = 21     p(2,{3}) = 3
        g(4,{3}) = c43 + g(3, ∅ ) = c43 + c31 = 12 + 15 = 27    p(4,{3}) = 3
Set {4}:
        g(2,{4}) = c24 + g(4, ∅ ) = c24 + c41 = 4 + 6 = 10      p(2,{4}) = 4
        g(3,{4}) = c34 + g(4, ∅ ) = c34 + c41 = 8 + 6 = 14      p(3,{4}) = 4

k = 2, consider sets of 2 elements:

Set {2,3}:
          g(4,{2,3}) = min {c42 + g(2,{3}), c43 + g(3,{2})} = min {3+21, 12+8}= min {24, 20}= 20
          p(4,{2,3}) = 3
Set {2,4}:
          g(3,{2,4}) = min {c32 + g(2,{4}), c34 + g(4,{2})} = min {7+10, 8+4}= min {17, 12} = 12
          p(3,{2,4}) = 4
Set {3,4}:
           g(2,{3,4}) = min {c23 + g(3,{4}), c24 + g(4,{3})} = min {6+14, 4+27}= min {20, 31}= 20
           p(2,{3,4}) = 3

Length of an optimal tour:

  f = g(1,{2,3,4}) = min { c12 + g(2,{3,4}), c13 + g(3,{2,4}), c14 + g(4,{2,3}) }
                   = min {2 + 20, 9 + 12, 10 + 20} = min {22, 21, 30} = 21

Predecessor of node 1: p(1,{2,3,4}) = 3

Predecessor of node 3: p(3, {2,4}) = 4

Predecessor of node 4: p(4, {2}) = 2

Predecessor of node 2: p(2, {}) = 1

Hence, an optimal TSP tour is given by 1 → 2→ 4 → 3→ 1.

Pseudocode

 function algorithm TSP (G, n) is
     for k := 2 to n do
         g({k}, k) := d(1, k)
     end for
 
     for s := 2 to n−1 do
         for all S ⊆ {2, ..., n}, |S| = s do
             for all k ∈ S do
                 g(S, k) := minm≠k,m∈S [g(S\{k}, m) + d(m, k)]
             end for
         end for
     end for
 
     opt := mink≠1 [g({2, 3, ..., n}, k) + d(k, 1)]
     return (opt)
 end function

Related algorithms

Exact algorithms for solving the TSP
Besides Dynamic Programming, Linear programming and Branch and bound are design patterns also used for exact solutions to the TSP. Linear programming applies the cutting plane method in integer programming, i.e. solving the LP formed by two constraints in the model and then seeking the cutting plane by adding inequality constraints to gradually converge at an optimal solution. When people apply this method to find a cutting plane, they often depend on experience, so this method is seldom used as a general method.

The term branch and bound was first used in 1963 in a paper published by Little et al. on the TSP, describing a technique of combining smaller search spaces and establishing lower bounds to enlarge the practical range of application for an exact solution. The technique is useful for expanding the number of cities able to be considered computationally, but still breaks down in large-scale data sets.

It controls the searching process through applying restrictive boundaries, allowing a search for the optimal solution branch from the space state tree to find an optimal solution as quickly as possible. The pivotal component of this algorithm is the selection of the restrictive boundary. Different restrictive boundaries may form different branch-bound algorithms.

Approximate algorithms for solving the TSP
As the application of precise algorithm to solve problem is very limited, we often use approximate algorithm or heuristic algorithm. The result of the algorithm can be assessed by C / C* ≤ ε . C is the total travelling distance generated from approximate algorithm; C* is the optimal travelling distance; ε is the upper limit for the ratio of the total travelling distance of approximate solution to optimal solution under the worst condition. The value of ε >1.0. The more it closes to 1.0, the better the algorithm is. These algorithms include: Interpolation algorithm, Nearest neighbour algorithm, Clark & Wright algorithm, Double spanning tree algorithm, Christofides algorithm, Hybrid algorithm, Probabilistic algorithm (such as Simulated annealing).

References

Dynamic programming
Travelling salesman problem